Microsoft Sync can refer to different technologies developed by Microsoft:

 Ford Sync, an in-car entertainment and navigation system
 Microsoft Sync Framework, a data synchronization platform